Kailua may refer to:

Places in Hawaii
 Kailua, Honolulu County, Hawaii, a census-designated place on Hawaii's island of Oahu
 Kailua High School, in Honolulu county
 Kailua-Kona, Hawaii, a census-designated place on Hawaii's island of Hawaii
 Kailua-Kona Airport, in Hawaii county

Other uses
 USS Kailua (IX-71), formerly CS Dickenson, a civilian cable-laying ship that became an auxiliary ship of the United States Navy in the Second World War

See also
 Kahlua (disambiguation)